Arroyo High School may refer to:

 Arroyo High School (San Lorenzo, California)
 Arroyo High School (El Monte, California)